Disambiguation: the name Dechmont, and an associated "Dechmont Hill" are also places near Cambuslang in Scotland

Dechmont Law is a hill in Livingston, West Lothian, Scotland. It lies around 700 yards southwest of the village of Dechmont, which provides its name. It is known locally as "Decky Hill" or as "Dechmont Hill" (Law is Lowland Scots for "hill"). "Deer Hill" is another peak of the same hill, to the northeast of the main peak.

It is the highest hill in the Livingston area, and Arthur's Seat and the Pentland Hills can be seen from here, as well as a view down the Almond valley.

Geology 
Dechmont Law is a volcanic plug.

History 
The slopes show signs of agricultural terracing, from the Bronze and Iron Age, but it is unclear whether it was ever a hillfort. Its strategic position makes this likely, but there is insufficient archaeological evidence.

The "Livingston Incident"

In 1979, forestry worker Bob Taylor had an alleged encounter with a UFO in the area of Dechmont Law.

Rory Blackhall murder 
In 2005, the body of 11 year old Rory Blackhall was found under an old, upside-down, two-person tent in woodland west of Dechmont Law. Rory's body was discovered after a methodical two hour search by a Countryside Ranger who knew the area well. Two mountain rescue members and a rescue dog, searching independently, were at the same spot a few minutes later. The Ranger helped the police to secure the area. The case has since closed, the murder suspect having committed suicide.

References

External links
Dechmont law
Aerial photos

Hills of the Scottish Midland Valley
Volcanic plugs of Scotland
Protected areas of West Lothian
Mountains and hills of West Lothian